Eisenia fetida, known under various common names such as manure worm, redworm, brandling worm, panfish worm, trout worm, tiger worm, red wiggler worm, etc., is a species of earthworm adapted to decaying organic material. These worms thrive in rotting vegetation, compost, and manure. They are epigean, rarely found in soil. In this trait, they resemble  Lumbricus rubellus.

Red wigglers are reddish-brown in color, have small rings around their body and have a yellowish tail. They have groups of bristles (called setae) on each segment that move in and out to grip nearby surfaces as the worms stretch and contract their muscles to push themselves forward or backward.

Eisenia fetida worms are native to Europe, but have been introduced (both intentionally and unintentionally) to every other continent except Antarctica. 

Eisenia fetida also possess a unique natural defense system in their coelomic fluid: cells called coelomocytes secrete a protein called lysenin, which is a pore-forming toxin (PFT), which is able to permeabilize and lyse invading cells. It is best at targeting foreign cells whose membranes contain significant amounts of sphingomyelin. (Lysenin is also toxic to organisms lacking sphingomyelin in their cell walls, including Bacillus megaterium, though the pathway is not understood).

Uses 
Eisenia fetida  are used for vermicomposting of both domestic and industrial organic waste. Vermicomposting septic systems have been used for decades and allow for decentralized on-site processing of blackwater using Eisenia fetida. Tiger worms are also being tested for use in a flushless toilet, currently being trialled in India, Uganda and Myanmar.

Moreover, red worm is widely used in fishing, being one of the most ideal baits for tench, bream and roach.

Odor 
When roughly handled, a redworm exudes a pungent liquid, thus the specific name fetida meaning "foul-smelling". This is presumably an antipredator adaptation.

Related species
Eisenia fetida is closely related to E. andrei, also referred to as E. f. andrei. The only simple way of distinguishing the two species is that E. fetida is sometimes lighter in colour. Molecular analyses have confirmed their identity as separate species, and breeding experiments have shown that they do produce hybrids.

The mitochondrial genetic characteristics of the Irish population of E. fetida could be the result of reproductive isolation and so suggests that this sample may constitute an unrecognized species or subspecies of E. fetida.

Reproduction

As with other earthworm species, E. fetida is hermaphroditic, and uniparental reproduction is possible, even if usually the reproduction is between copulating individuals. The two worms join clitella, the large, lighter-colored bands which contain the worms' reproductive organs, and which are only prominent during the reproduction process. The two worms exchange sperm. Both worms then secrete cocoons which contain several eggs each. These cocoons are lemon-shaped and are pale yellow at first, becoming more brownish as the worms inside become mature. These cocoons are clearly visible to the naked eye. At 25°C E. fetida hatches from its cocoon in about 3 weeks.

Life expectancy
The life expectancy of Eisenia fetida under controlled conditions varies, according to different authors, between one and five years.

References

External links
"Identify Tiger Worm".

Lumbricidae
Animals described in 1826
Coprophagous animals
Composting
Organic gardening
Taxa named by Marie Jules César Savigny